Steven Alexander Torrealba [tor-ray-AHL-bah] (born February 24, 1978 in Barquisimeto, Venezuela) is a former Major League Baseball catcher. He is a right-handed batter who played in the majors for the Atlanta Braves (2001–2002). Torrealba's father, Pablo Torrealba, also pitched for the Braves, along with the Athletics and White Sox from 1975 to 1979.

Career
Torrealba was signed as an undrafted free agent by the Atlanta Braves in 1995, working his way up the system until he made his major league debut on October 6, 2001. In his only at-bat of the postseason in 2001, Torrealba hit a double in Game 1 of the NLDS against the Houston Astros. He appeared in only 2 games for the Braves in 2001 and 13 in 2002 and became a free agent after the 2002 season. On February 13, 2003, he signed with the St. Louis Cardinals and played 46 games for Triple-A Memphis, becoming a free agent after the season. On February 4, 2004, he signed with the New York Yankees. Torrealba played only 4 games for Triple-A Columbus before being released on April 28.

In 2005, he signed with the Long Island Ducks of the independent Atlantic League. He played 98 games, batting .263 with 8 home runs. In 2006, he played with the Atlantic City Surf, after being signed by the Cincinnati Reds in January, but not playing any games for them. On January 10, 2007, Torrealba signed with the Detroit Tigers and played for their Double-A affiliate in Erie. He spent 2008 and 2009 in the Baltimore Orioles organization before becoming a free agent at the end of the 2009 season.

In a two-season career, Torrealba hit .105 with one RBI in 17 games played.

See also
 List of second-generation Major League Baseball players
 List of Major League Baseball players from Venezuela

External links
, or Retrosheet, or Pura Pelota (VPBL stats)

1978 births
Living people
Atlanta Braves players
Atlantic City Surf players
Bowie Baysox players
Cardenales de Lara players
Caribes de Anzoátegui players
Caribes de Oriente players
Columbus Clippers players
Danville Braves players
Erie SeaWolves players
Gulf Coast Braves players
Greenville Braves players
Leones del Caracas players
Long Island Ducks players
Macon Braves players
Major League Baseball catchers
Major League Baseball players from Venezuela
Memphis Redbirds players
Mexican League baseball catchers
Myrtle Beach Pelicans players
Navegantes del Magallanes players
Norfolk Tides players
Sportspeople from Barquisimeto
Richmond Braves players
Rieleros de Aguascalientes players
Tiburones de La Guaira players
Venezuelan expatriate baseball players in Mexico
Venezuelan expatriate baseball players in the United States